Manuel Ruiz López, also known as Emmanuel Ruiz, (5 May 1804 – 10 July 1860) was a priest of the Order of Friars minor.

He was captured by Druz Muslims and forced to embrace Islam, which he refused and was killed by being cut into pieces in Damascus, Syria, on 10 July 1860. As one of the Damascus Martyrs he has been beatified in 1926.

Beatification 
Pope Pius XI declared Ruiz Lopez a martyr on 2 May 1926. He was beatified by Pope Pius XI on 10 October 1926. His feast is celebrated on 10 July.

References 

19th-century Spanish Roman Catholic priests
Spanish beatified people
Beatifications by Pope Pius XI
1804 births
1860 deaths